Bill Hutchinson is a Canadian politician. He represented the constituency of Regina South in the Legislative Assembly of Saskatchewan, as a member of the Saskatchewan Party.

Cabinet positions

References

External links
 Bill Hutchinson - MLA web site
 Honourable Bill Hutchinson - cabinet web site

Canadian people of Scottish descent
Saskatchewan Party MLAs
Living people
Politicians from Regina, Saskatchewan
Members of the Executive Council of Saskatchewan
21st-century Canadian politicians
Year of birth missing (living people)